Wajdi Sahli (Arabic:وجدي سهلي ; born 17 April 1997) is a Tunisian professional footballer who plays as a right-winger for Montenegrin club Sutjeska Nikśić.

Career
On 17 August 2021, Apollon Smyrnis announced the signing of Sahli.

Career statistics

References

External links
Soccerway.com Profile

1997 births
Living people
Tunisian footballers
Association football forwards
Tunisian Ligue Professionnelle 1 players
Kazakhstan Premier League players
Super League Greece players
Club Africain players
FC Caspiy players
Apollon Smyrnis F.C. players
Association football wingers
Expatriate footballers in Greece
Tunisian expatriate sportspeople in Greece